Sillans-la-Cascade is a commune in the Var department in the Provence-Alpes-Côte d'Azur region of Southeastern France. In 2017, it had a population of 752.

Tourism

As the commune's name suggests, it has a spectacular waterfall: the Cascade de Sillans, 44 metres (48 yards) high.

See also
Communes of the Var department

References

Communes of Var (department)